East Pond is a small lake north-northeast of Minnehaha in Herkimer County, New York. It drains west via an unnamed creek that flows into Lost Creek.

See also
 List of lakes in New York

References 

Lakes of New York (state)
Lakes of Herkimer County, New York